James Paterson may refer to:

Sportsmen
James Paterson (cricketer) (1889-1966), New Zealand cricketer
James Paterson (footballer) (1907–?), Scottish international footballer
James Paterson (rugby league) (1898-1969), English rugby league footballer of the 1920s
James Paterson (rugby union) (born 1987), New Zealand–American rugby player 
James Paterson (skier), Australian Paralympic skier
Jamie Paterson (footballer, born 1973), Scottish footballer
Jamie Paterson (footballer, born 1991), English footballer
Jim Paterson (footballer) (born 1979), Scottish footballer who is a player-coach for Dunfermline Athletic
Jim Paterson (rugby league) (born 1934), Australian rugby league footballer
Jimmy Paterson (Australian footballer)  (1870–1927), Australian rules footballer
Jimmy Paterson (1891–1959), physician and amateur footballer who played for Queen's Park and Arsenal in the 1920s

Other
James Hamilton-Paterson, British poet, won Newdigate Prize in 1964
James Paterson (journalist) (1805–1876), Scottish writer and antiquary
James Paterson (mayor), mayor of Melbourne, 1876–1877
James Paterson (painter) (1854–1932), Scottish landscape painter
James Paterson (New Zealand politician) (1807–1886), New Zealand politician
James Paterson (Australian politician) (born 1987), Australian Senator
James Paterson (priest), Dean of Argyll and The Isles from 1846 until 1848
James Paterson (radical), one of the leaders of the Society of the United Scotsmen
James Ralston Kennedy Paterson (1897–1981), Scottish radiologist

See also
James Patterson (disambiguation)